Urimai is a 1985 Indian Tamil-language film directed by Rama Narayanan starring Suresh and Nalini. It was released on 15 March 1985.

Plot
Suresh is the only child of the rich businessman Maragathammal. He's a womanizer and a general wastrel that wanders aimlessly with his uncle as his accomplice. Maragathammal has given up hope of Suresh ever making anything of himself. Rani is a poor teacher that catches Suresh's wandering eye. Initially, his interest is superficial but he soon falls in love with her and she reciprocates. The two marry but are treated with skepticism by Maragathammal. Rani eventually wins over her mother-in-law but tragedy strikes soon after when the couple are in a car accident. Rani is presumed dead, along with Suresh's dog, Raja. A heartbroken Suresh is thrown into confusion when not one but two women claiming to be Rani show up after surviving the crash.

Cast

Suresh as Suresh
Nalini as Rani / Clara
M. N. Rajam as Maragathammal
Radha Ravi as Kannaayiram
Srikanth  as Kaali
S. S. Chandran as Suresh's uncle
Vennira Aadai Moorthy as Manager
Senthil as Ambulimama

Soundtrack 
The music was composed by Ilaiyaraaja.

References

External links 
 

Films directed by Rama Narayanan
1985 films
Films scored by Ilaiyaraaja
1980s Tamil-language films